Vriesea tequendamae is a species of flowering plant in the Bromeliaceae family. It is native to Venezuela, Colombia, Peru, and Ecuador.

References

tequendamae
Flora of South America
Epiphytes
Plants described in 1888
Taxa named by Édouard André
Taxa named by Lyman Bradford Smith